Pınarkent  is a town in the central district Denizli of Denizli Province, Turkey.

Geography 
It is both on the railway to İzmir and state highway  to Aegean Sea coast. The population of Pınarkent was 5,390 as of 2012.

History 
The probable origin of the population of the town is the Danishment tribe of Turkmens. The tribe was a nomadic tribe but in 1700s, the Ottoman government forced them to settle. After some clashes the tribe settled in what is now Pınarkent and they changed their primary source of income, from sheep breeding to agriculture. In the 20th century, after irrigation facilities were improved and mechanization was introduced, the settlement flourished and it was declared a township in 1992.

Economy 
Situated in the fertile plain, the town's economy depends on agriculture. But lately textile industry is replacing agriculture. Travertine mining  is another profitable sector.

References

Populated places in Denizli Province
Towns in Turkey
Pamukkale District